Douglas Andrew Fuller (born May 14, 1968) is an American politician in the state of Minnesota. He served in the Minnesota House of Representatives.

References

Republican Party members of the Minnesota House of Representatives
1968 births
Living people